Queens of Diamonds and Hearts is a Hong Kong costume drama produced by TVB and starring Roger Kwok, Fala Chen, Sharon Chan and Louis Yuen. A blessing ceremony was held on 5 September 2011 at Tseung Kwan O TVB City's Shaolin Temple at 11:30PM where filming began.

The drama is based on the folk tale of Zhong Wu Yen a queen of the Warring States kingdom of Qi.

Synopsis
This synopsis uses Cantonese romanisations

King Chai (Roger Kwok) is the inept ruler of Qi, a state surrounded by larger neighbours and beset with hidden internal and overt external threats. The guardian spirits of Qi come to the aid of Qi and King Chai by arranging for Chung Mo Yim (Fala Chen) to become the Queen of Qi. Chung Mo Yim is skilled in magic, martial arts and the use of strategms, however she has been born with a prominent birth mark on her face and King Chai finds her ugly. The opponents of Qi in turn arrange for King Chai to become infatuated with Ha Ying Chun (Sharon Chan). King Chai takes both Chung Mo Yim and Ha Ying Chun as co-wives, with Chung Mo Yim becoming Queen of the East Palace and Ha Ying Chun becoming Queen of the West Palace.

Although naive and kind hearted Ha Ying Chun is jinxed by Qi's enemies and all of King Chai's attempts to please her lead to disaster after disaster, problems that only Chung Mo Yim can defuse and fix. Although originally she only married King Chai out of duty to the people and nation of Qi, Chung Mo Yim comes to desire to be more than King Chai's troubleshooter and a wife in name only.

Cast
This cast list uses Cantonese romanisations

Royal Family

Other cast

Viewership ratings

References

2012 Hong Kong television series debuts
2012 Hong Kong television series endings
TVB dramas
Fantasy television series